The twenty-eighth series of Casualty began airing on BBC One on 3 August 2013, one week after the end of the previous series. This series consisted of 48 episodes, the highest episode order since series 24. The series concluded on 23 August 2014.

This series saw the departures of Tom Kent (Oliver Coleman), Sam Nicholls (Charlotte Salt), Jamie Collier (Daniel Anthony) and Adrian "Fletch" Fletcher (Alex Walkinshaw), and temporary departures of Zoe Hanna (Sunetra Sarker) and Kathleen "Dixie Dixon (Jane Hazlegrove). This series also welcomed Lily Chao (Crystal Yu), Rita Freeman (Chloe Howman), Ethan Hardy (George Rainsford), Caleb Knight (Richard Winsor) and Ben "Lofty" Chiltern (Lee Mead); as well as the returns of Holby City character, Connie Beauchamp (Amanda Mealing), and paramedics Iain Dean (Michael Stevenson) and Tamzin Bayle (Gemma Atkinson).

Production
Nikki Wilson served as Series Producer until episode 18, the final episode of 2013. Erika Hossington serves as the Series Producer from episode 19, the first episode of 2014. Oliver Kent is the Executive Producer for the series.

The theme tune that has been in place since 2001 (apart from a brief theme tune change during 2006-07) is used until episode 18. Episode 19 features a new version of the theme tune more akin to the original 1986 theme. The lead into the end music is also more akin to the original. The titles remained the same until episode 23 when a new version of the opening titles were introduced in episode 24, replacing the opening titles that were used since January 2012.

Cast 
The twenty-eighth series of Casualty features a cast of characters working for the NHS within the emergency department of Holby City Hospital and the Holby Ambulance Service. Daniel Anthony portrays Jamie Collier, a staff nurse, and Matt Bardock appears as Jeff Collier, a paramedic. Oliver Coleman stars as Tom Kent, an emergency pediatrician, and Charles Dale features as Big Mac, a hospital porter. Jane Hazlegrove plays Kathleen "Dixie" Dixon, a paramedic and the operational duty manager at Holby Ambulance Service. Amanda Henderson portrays staff nurse Robyn Miller and Tony Marshall and Azuka Oforka appear as Noel Garcia and Louise Tyler, the department's receptionists. Suzanne Packer features as Tess Bateman, a sister and the department's clinical nurse manager. Patrick Robinson stars as Martin "Ash" Ashford, a consultant in emergency medicine. Charlotte Salt plays Sam Nicholls, a CT2 doctor, and Sunetra Sarker portrays Zoe Hanna, a consultant and the department's clinical lead. Original cast member Derek Thompson stars as Charlie Fairhead, a senior charge nurse, and Alex Walkinshaw features as senior staff nurse Adrian "Fletch" Fletcher. Additionally, Adrian Harris appears as Norman Burnton in a recurring capacity.

On 30 July 2013, it was announced that actresses Crystal Yu and Chloe Howman had joined the show's regular cast for this series. Yu portrays junior doctor Lily Chao and debuts in the opening episode. Howman plays staff nurse Rita Freeman and joins in episode two. Executive producer Oliver Kent said that the pair would "hit the ground running and [...] create a stir in the ED". The opening episode also features a guest appearance from Honor Blackman, known for her role as a Bond girl. She plays "a feisty pensioner on a mission" with a backstory as an ambulance driver in warzones. Kent remarked that her casting was a notable one for the show and called Blackman's role "a fantastically witty and charming character". Michael Stevenson reprised his role as Iain Dean; he previously appeared in series 26 as the former Army colleague of Sam who she had an affair with. The character is reintroduced in episode 5 as a student paramedic who is "extremely confident and may need to be kept in line". Stevenson departed in episode 30.

Jamie Davis joined the cast in episode nine as Max Walker, a "cool and laid-back" hospital porter. Episode 14 features the departures of Salt and Coleman in their respective roles of Sam and Tom. Their final episode resolves their relationship as the pair get married before leaving. The castings of George Rainsford and Richard Winsor, in the respective roles of Ethan Hardy and Caleb Knight, were announced in September 2013. The pair are siblings and join the team as new registrars. Ethan debuts in episode 20, followed by Cal in episode 21. Davood Ghadami guest stars in two early episodes of the series as gay Iranian asylum seeker Ramin Tehrani. Producers noticed "a rather nice chemistry" between Ghadami and Anthony, so when the latter opted to leave his role as Jamie, producers reintroduced Ramin as part of his exit. Jamie departs in episode 24. Anthony's departure left a opening for a new male nurse. Kent wanted to cast Lee Mead, so created a role for him, which the actor accepted. Mead's casting in the role of "likeable and popular" staff nurse Ben "Lofty" Chiltern was announced in September 2013. He first appears in episode 27.

On 23 July 2013, it was announced that Amanda Mealing would reprise her role as consultant Connie Beauchamp in the series. Mealing had played Connie in the show's spin-off series Holby City for six years until 2010, and had also made appearances in Casualty during crossover events. The character is billed as "confident" but "fair" with concern about her reputation and that of the department. The actress expressed her excitement at reprising her role, while Kent dubbed Connie "an iconic character". Connie returns in episode 31; a specially-filmed trailer was released to promote her return. John Michie regularly guest stars as his Holby City character Guy Self from episode 31, as part of Connie's introduction and ongoing story. Hazlegrove took a break from her role as Dixie during this series, and returned in the following series. Following Dixie's exit, Gemma Atkinson reprised her role as paramedic Tamzin Bayle in episode 38; she had last appeared in series 27. Writers used the character's return to explore the relationship between Tamzin and Jeff again.

Walkinshaw's departure from the series was announced in April 2014; he left to reprise his role of Fletch in Holby City. Fletch departs in episode 43. Michelle Collins joined the show's guest cast as Samantha Kellman, a love interest for Jeff, for a two-month guest stint. She appears from episode 44. The actress was offered the role shortly after finishing filming on Coronation Street and liked the differences between the characters. Kent expressed his excitement at the character's introduction. Sarker took a break from the serial in 2014 and her character Zoe temporarily departs at the conclusion of the series. Series producer Erika Hossington used the break to create a new storyline for Zoe. She returns in the following series.

Main characters 

Daniel Anthony as Jamie Collier
Matt Bardock as Jeff Collier
Oliver Coleman as Tom Kent
Charles Dale as Big Mac
Jamie Davis as Max Walker
Jane Hazlegrove as Kathleen "Dixie" Dixon
Amanda Henderson as Robyn Miller
Chloe Howman as Rita Freeman
Tony Marshall as Noel Garcia
Lee Mead as Ben "Lofty" Chiltern
Amanda Mealing as Connie Beauchamp
Azuka Oforka as Louise Tyler
Suzanne Packer as Tess Bateman
George Rainsford as Ethan Hardy
Patrick Robinson as Martin "Ash" Ashford
Charlotte Salt as Sam Nicholls
Sunetra Sarker as Zoe Hanna
Derek Thompson as Charlie Fairhead
Alex Walkinshaw as Adrian "Fletch" Fletcher
Richard Winsor as Caleb Knight
Crystal Yu as Lily Chao

Recurring characters 

Gemma Atkinson as Tamzin Bayle
Adrian Harris as Norman Burnton
Tahirah Sharif as Ella Ashford
Michael Stevenson as Iain Dean

Guest characters 

Honor Blackman as Agatha Kirkpatrick
Michelle Collins as Samantha Kellman
Davood Ghadami as Ramin Tehrani
John Michie as Guy Self

Episodes

References
 Notes

 General

 Titles, credits, airdates and summaries: Casualty series 28. Retrieved 24 June 2019
 Airdates and summaries: 
 Viewing figures: 

 Specific

External links

28
2013 British television seasons
2014 British television seasons